Jon Robert Smith (born 1945 Lake Charles, Louisiana) is an American tenor saxophonist, prolific as a rock and roll, R&B, delta blues, jazz, and fusion studio and live performance musician.

Selected discography

As leader
 Jon Smith, Jon R. Smith (CD, arrangements by Lawrence Sieberth; produced by Lawrence Sieberth and Jon Smith), 2007, Grand Pointe Records

As sideman
 Edgar Winter, White Trash, (LP, horn Arrangements: Jon Smith/Edgar Winter), 1970, Epic Records
 Richard Landry, Solos — Live at the Leo Castelli Gallery, New York, February 19, 1972, Chatham Square; 
 Edgar Winter, Roadwork (LP, horn Arrangements: Jon Smith/Edgar Winter), 1972, Epic Records
 Edgar Winter, Recycled (LP, horn Arrangements: Jon Smith/Edgar Winter), 1976, Blue Sky Records
 Edgar Winter, The Real Deal (CD, Featuring the Legendary White Trash Horns), 1996, Intersound Records
 Edgar Winter, Winter Blues (CD, Featuring the Legendary White Trash Horns), 1999, Pyramid Records 	 
 Edgar Winter, The Best of Edgar Winter (CD, horn arrangements: Jon Smith/Edgar Winter), 2002, Sony Records
 Toto, Toto IV, (LP), 1982, Sony/Columbia 		  	 
 Peter Maffay, Heute vor dreißig Jahren (CD, horn arrangements:  Bertram Engel (de)/Jon Smith/Steve Howard), 2001, BMG/Ariola; 
 Peter Maffay, X (TOUR ONLY), 2000, BMG/Ariola; 
 Peter Maffay, Wenn eine Idee Lebendig Wird / Begegnungen Live (CD, horn arrangements: Bertram Engel (de)/Jon Smith/Steve Howard), 1999, BMG/Ariola; 
 Peter Maffay, Something Will Happen (CD), 1998, BMG/Ariola; 
 Peter Maffay, Begegnungen (horn arrangements: Bertram Engel (de)/Jon Smith/Steve Howard, CD), 1998, BMG/Ariola; 
 Carl Carlton & The Songdogs, Revolution Avenue (horn arrangements: Bertram Engel (de)/Jon Smith/Steve Howard, CD), 2001, EMI
 The Doobie Brothers, Toulouse Street (LP), 1972, Warner Bros. Records 		  	 
 The Doobie Brothers, Long Train Runnin', 1970, 2000" (CD), 1999, WEA/Rhino Records
 Randy Newman, Trouble in Paradise (LP), 1983, Warner Bros. Records
 Randy Newman, Guilty: 30 Years of Randy Newman (CD), 1998, Rhino Records 		  	 
 Dr. John, Remedies, (LP), 1969, Columbia Records  	 
 Rascals, Peaceful World (LP), 1970, Columbia Records 		  	 
 Rascals, Island of Real (LP), 1971, Columbia Records
 Sarah Vaughan, Songs of the Beatles (LP), 1982, Columbia Records 		  	 
 Jerry LaCroix, LaCroix (LP, horn arrangements: Jon Smith/Jerry LaCroix), 1972, Epic Records
 Redbone, Wovoka (LP, horn arrangements: Jon Smith/Charlie Brent), 1972, Columbia Records
 Rick Derringer, Rock & Roll Hoochie Coo: The Best of Rick Derringer (CD), 1996, Epic Associated/Legacy
 Johnny Winter, Saints & Sinners (LP), 1972, Columbia Records
 Sea Level, Long Walk on a Short Pier (LP, horn arrangements: Jon Smith/Charlie Brent), 1979, Capricorn Records
 Sea Level, Best of Sea Level (LP, horn arrangements: Jon Smith/Charlie Brent), 1977, Capricorn Records
 Albert Collins, Collins Mix - The Best of (CD, horn arrangements: Jon Smith/Steve Howard - The Legendary White Trash Horns), 1993, Pointblank Records
 Albert Collins & The Icebreakers, Live '92 - '93 (CD, horn arrangements: Jon Smith/Steve Howard - "The Legendary White Trash Horns"), 1993, Pointblank Records
 Clarence 'Gatemouth' Brown, The Man (CD), 1994, PolyGram/Verve
 Bobby Charles, Last Train To Memphis (CD), 2004, Proper Pairs
 Larry Garner, You Need to Live a Little (CD, horn arrangements: Jon Smith/Steve Howard - "The Legendary White Trash Horns"), 1994, PolyGram/Verve
 Larry Garner, Baton Rouge (CD, horn arrangements: Jon Smith/Steve Howard - "The Legendary White Trash Horns"), 1995, PolyGram/Verve
 Sonny Landreth, South of I-10 (CD), 1995, Zoo/Praxis
 Sonny Landreth, Levee Town (CD, horn arrangements: Mike Post/Jon Smith/Steve Howard/Sonny Landreth), 2000, Sugar Hill
 Junior Wells, Everybody's Gettin' Some (CD, horn arrangements: Jon Smith/Steve Howard - "The Legendary White Trash Horns"), 1995, Telarc Records
 Billy Branch, The Blues Keep Following Me Around (CD, horn arrangements: Jon Smith/Steve Howard - "The Legendary White Trash Horns"), 1995, PGD/PolyGram Pop
 C.J. Chenier & The Red Hot Louisiana Band, The Big Squeeze (CD, horn arrangements: Jon Smith/Steve Howard - "The Legendary White Trash Horns"), 1996, Alligator Records
 Coco Montoya, Suspicion (CD, horn arrangements: Jon Smith/Steve Howard - "The Legendary White Trash Horns"), 2000, Alligator Records
 The Mambo Brothers Blues Band, Night Owl (CD, horn arrangements: Charlie Brent/Jon Smith), 1994, Streetwise Enterprises Inc.; 
 The Mambo Brothers Blues Band, We Got It Goin' On (CD, horn arrangements: Charlie Brent/Jon Smith), 1997, Streetwise Enterprises Inc.; 
 The Forever Fabulous Chickenhawks (self-titled) (CD, horn arrangements: Charlie Brent/Jon Smith; Featuring Louisiana/Texas Legends Big Luther Kent, Al "TNT" Braggs, Jon Smith & the White Trash Horns), 1997; 
 The Forever Fabulous Chickenhawks, Live (CD, horn arrangements: Charlie Brent/Jon Smith), 1996; 
 Luther Kent, Down in New Orleans (CD, horn arrangements: Jon Smith), 1999, Louisiana Red Hot Records
 The Fabulous Boogie Kings, Nine Lives (CD), 1993, Gin Records; 
 The Fabulous Boogie Kings, Louisiana Country Soul (CD, Produced by Jon Smith/Ned Theall, horn arrangements: Jon Smith/Ned Theall), 1993, Gin Records (Ville Platte, LA); 
 Geno Delafose With The White Trash Horns (CD), 1994, Rounder Records
 The Fabulous Boogie Kings, Swamp Boogie Blues (CD, Produced by Jon Smith/Ned Theall, horn arrangements: Jon Smith/Ned Theall), 1996, Gin Records
 The Fabulous Boogie Kings, Walkin' the Dog (CD, Executive Producers: Jon Smith/Ned Theall, horn arrangements: Jon Smith/Ned Theall), 1999, CSP Records; 
 Various Artists, A Celebration of Blues: Great Louisiana Blues (CD), 1997, Celebration of Blues; 
 Various Artists, Absolute Blues, Vol. 2 (CD), 1997, Stony Plain; 
 Various Artists, Big Blues Extravaganza: The Best of Austin City Limits (CD), 1998, Columbia/Legacy; 
 Various Artists, Blues Masters vol. 17 - More Postmodern Blues (CD), 1998, Columbia/Legacy; 
 Greenlight Caravan - Mother Earth Revival (CD). Saxophone, Room 909(M.Clark),Lay Down Low(M.Clark,D.Fontenot) (CD) 2008 Smashing Grass Records

References

External links
 Jon R. Smith official website

1946 births
Living people
Blues musicians from Louisiana
American rock saxophonists
American male saxophonists
21st-century American saxophonists
21st-century American male musicians